Ragga Twins Step Out is a 2008 compilation album by The Ragga Twins.

Release
Ragga Twins Step Out was released by Soul Jazz Records on June 30, 2008, on CD and vinyl.

Release and reception

Dorian Lynskey of The Guardian gave the album a four out of five rating, proclaiming that the duo "flaunt their skills on Juggling bug Shut Up and Dance atmospheric, ingenious production means that the virtually instrumental "Spliffhead (Remix)" and "The Homeless Problem" are no less gripping." A review in The Montreal Gazette gave the album a three and a half out of five rating, finding that the album "sounds dated now, but shows the great way they mashed up the worlds of dancehall reggae and club culture, forging a path to jungle, 2step, grime and beyond." Melissa Bradshaw of Plan B noted the album was only a near-complete collection of Ragga Twins tracks, noting the absence of tracks like "Hooligan 69" which was described as being "blatant plagiarism of Prince's "Let's Go Crazy"" and declared the album as reminding "us just how seminal [The Ragga Twins] were. And the music is spinetingly good." David Dacks of Exclaim! praised the album, stating that "this comp proves that the punk-like simplicity and excitement of their singular album from 1991 and other contemporary tracks were a milestone in dance music. This music is still terrifically exciting. "

Track listing
Track listing adapted from back of album sleeve and liner notes. All track composed by Smiley, PJ, Deman Rockers, and Flinty Badman except where noted.

Credits
Credits adapted from the liner notes.
 Stuart Baker - compiler, sleeve notes
 Adrian Self - sleeve design
 Dino St. Wye - sleeve design
 Pete Reilly - mastering
 Duncan Cowell - mastering
 Aki/Retna Pictures - photography
 Paul Massey - photography
 Adrian Fisk - photography
 Stefan De Batselier - photography
 Shut Up and Dance - producer (all tracks except "Hard Drugs" and "Iron Lady")
 Ribs - producer (on "Hard Drugs" and "Iron Lady")

References

Sources
 
 
 
 

2008 compilation albums
Soul Jazz Records compilation albums
Ragga Twins compilation albums